Thrill of a Lifetime is a television reality series (before that term was coined) created by Sidney M. Cohen (who also directed many of the episodes) and Willie Stein.  It was telecast from 1981 to 1988 in Canada on the CTV network. Thrill of a Lifetime gave viewers the chance to live their dreams, with thrills ranging from daredevil adventures to the romantic. The program was hosted by Doug Paulson, with Teri Austin joining as co-host later in its run. One of the program's more notable episodes was in its first season, when it arranged for an aspiring model named Shannon Tweed to pose for Playboy, which led to her becoming 1982's Playmate of the Year and launching an acting career.

Thrill of a Lifetime was revived in 2002 with new episodes produced and telecast in Canada and other countries.

Episodes
The original run of Thrill of a Lifetime ran for six seasons.

Season 1

Season 2

Season 3

Season 4

Season 5

Season 6

References

External links
 
Super People Productions (Producer's website)

1981 Canadian television series debuts
1988 Canadian television series endings
1980s Canadian reality television series
CTV Television Network original programming